Stenopus hispidus is a shrimp-like decapod crustacean belonging to the infraorder Stenopodidea. Common names include coral banded shrimp and banded cleaner shrimp.

Distribution
Stenopus hispidus has a pan-tropical distribution, extending into some temperate areas. It is found in the western Atlantic Ocean from Canada to Brazil, including the Gulf of Mexico. In Australia, it is found as far south as Sydney and it also occurs around New Zealand.

Description
The ground colour is transparent, but the carapace, abdomen and the large third pereiopod are all banded red and white. The antennae and other pereiopods are white. The abdomen, carapace and third pereiopods are covered in spines.

Stenopus hispidus has the ability to detect individuals of its species. This trait is uncommon in invertebrates and is most likely explained through chemical signals.

Ecology
It is a cleaner shrimp, and advertises to passing fish by slowly waving its long, white antennae. S. hispidus uses its three pairs of claws to remove parasites, fungi and damaged tissue from the fish. Stenopus hispidus is monogamous. S. hispidus females are typically larger than the males. Occupy a territory that is 1–2 meters in diameter.

Images

References

External links

 

Stenopodidea
Crustaceans of the Atlantic Ocean
Marine fauna of Africa
Marine fauna of Asia
Marine fauna of Oceania
Marine fauna of North America
Marine fauna of South America
Marine fauna of Southeast Asia
Anthozoa of the United States
Crustaceans described in 1811